The Volari V3 is a video card manufactured by XGI Technology.

History 
The V3 was introduced on September 15, 2003. It is a budget option, available with an 8x Accelerated Graphics Port interface from Walton Chaintech Corporation. It is similar in performance to the ATI Radeon 9200 SE, but is generally lower-priced.

References

External links 

 XGI Technology website
 PSA Walton Chaintech Corporation

Graphics cards